Elachista brachyplectra is a moth in the family Elachistidae. It was described by Edward Meyrick in 1921. It is found on Java and in Sri Lanka and southern India.

The wingspan is 5–6 mm. The forewings are dark fuscous, slightly speckled with whitish and there is a short rather oblique white streak from the middle of the costa and a subdorsal dot beneath it. There is a white dot on the tornus, and a dot or short oblique streak on the costa rather beyond it. The hindwings are grey.

References

Moths described in 1921
brachyplectra
Moths of Asia